Roman Ivanovych Salnikov  (born February 18, 1976, in Kharkiv, Soviet Union) is a Ukrainian former ice hockey left wing.

Salnikov played in the Russian Superleague for HC Neftekhimik Nizhnekamsk, Krylya Sovetov Moscow and Amur Khabarovsk.

He was also a member of the Ukraine national ice hockey team, playing in eight World Championships as well as the 2002 Winter Olympics

Career statistics

Regular season and playoffs

International

References 

Roman Salnikov at eurohockey.net

1976 births
Living people
Amur Khabarovsk players
HC Berkut-Kyiv players
Ice hockey players at the 2002 Winter Olympics
Keramin Minsk players
Kompanion Kiev players
Krylya Sovetov Moscow players
HC Neftekhimik Nizhnekamsk players
Olympic ice hockey players of Ukraine
ShVSM Kyiv players
Sokil Kyiv players
Sportspeople from Kharkiv
Ukrainian ice hockey forwards
HC Vityaz players
HK Vityaz Kharkiv players